The Jazz Crusaders at the Lighthouse is a live album by The Jazz Crusaders recorded in 1962 and released on the Pacific Jazz label.

Reception

AllMusic rated the album with 3 stars.

Track listing 
 "Congolese Sermon" (Wayne Henderson) - 6:50
 "Cathy's Dilemma" (Henderson) - 7:07
 "Blues for Ramona" (Stix Hooper) - 7:10
 "Weather Beat" (Joe Sample) - 7:05
 "Scandalizing" (Sample) - 7:12
 "Appointment in Ghana" (Jackie McLean) - 6:55
 "Penny Blue" (Sample) - 7:31 Bonus track on CD reissue
 "Boopie" (Wilton Felder) - 9:28 Bonus track on CD reissue

Personnel 
The Jazz Crusaders 
Wayne Henderson - trombone
Wilton Felder - tenor saxophone
Joe Sample - piano
Victor Gaskin - bass
Stix Hooper - drums

References 

The Jazz Crusaders live albums
1962 live albums
Pacific Jazz Records live albums
Albums recorded at the Lighthouse Café